Quaqua incarnata is a species of succulent plant in the genus Quaqua. It is endemic to the Namaqualand region of South Africa and Namibia.

Conservation status 
Quaqua incarnata is classified as Least Concern as the population is stable.

References

External links 
 

Endemic flora of South Africa
Flora of South Africa
Flora of Southern Africa
Flora of the Cape Provinces
Asclepiadoideae